Scientists in School is a leading Canadian science, technology, engineering, and math (STEM) education charitable organization that offers curriculum-aligned hands-on workshops from Kindergarten to Grade 8 across the country . Workshops are offered in both English and French and led by presenters that are experts in their fields. Scientists in School offers community workshops providing their program to libraries, summer camps, daycares, after-school programs and community groups. They have reached over 10 million children and youth since 1989.

Scientists in School’s mission is to ignite scientific curiosity in children so that they question intelligently; learn through discovery; connect scientific knowledge to their world; are excited about science, technology, engineering and math; and have their interest in careers in those fields piqued.

History 

Scientists in School was founded in 1989 by Erica Bruce and Dr. Nancy Williams on behalf of the Ajax-Pickering, Ontario branch of the Canadian Federation of University Women (CFUW). Originally, Scientists in School was guided by the CFUW’s mandate that female graduates use their education to effect social change, but in 1999, when Scientists in Schools participating students grew to over 100,000, Scientists in School incorporated as a charitable non-profit.

Scientists in School began with 40 classrooms participating in the Durham region, then expanded to Toronto (1997) and Guelph in (1999). Expansion grew exponentially, serving kids in Peel, Waterloo, Halton, Niagara, and Ottawa. The first branch outside of Ontario launched in Lethbridge, Alberta (2010), again in collaboration with the local branch of the CFUW.

Scientists in School reached their 5 millionth student and a French language workshop stream was developed for Eastern Ontario (2012). A community workshop program was launched (2013), providing workshops to daycares, summer camps, libraries and community groups.

In 2014, Scientists in School celebrated their 25th year and officially added a second Alberta branch in Calgary. Their focus on equity expanded with the launch of the Adopt-a-School initiative, fully supporting schools serving under-resourced communities with complimentary workshops for every classroom. With the help of visionary partners, 33 schools were adopted, giving 17,800 children the opportunity to experience Scientists in School.

In 2019, Scientists in School reached their 8 millionth young scientist. Their Adopt-a-School impact almost tripled to supporting 47,500 students in 88 schools serving low-income communities across Ontario and Alberta. Scientists in School launched a Lift-a-School initiative, which like Adopt-a-School, supports schools serving low-income communities that are unable to afford the workshop fee, providing complimentary workshops on a one-to-one match for every workshop paid for by the school.

In 2020, Scientists in School reached their 10 millionth student.

Scientists in School responded to the pandemic by launching a virtual delivery model that includes delivering topic-curated mini science bags for every student in advance of the workshop. The virtual program includes over 40 virtual community and classroom workshops combined. The virtual model enabled Scientists in School to become a national organization delivering workshops in every province from coast to coast.

In 2020, Spotlight with Scientists in School, an original STEM career interview series was launched. Interviews highlight scientists who are trailblazers in their fields exploring science topics trending in the news with a focus on ways to increase diversity, equity, and inclusion in STEM. Spotlight with Scientists in School premieres on their Facebook page and YouTube channel. In 2022, Spotlight with Scientists in School aired on Rogers TV in eight regions across Ontario including Durham, Ottawa, London, Uxbridge, Georgina, Orangeville, Keswick, and Owen Sound. Rogers premieres Spotlight episodes bi-weekly.

In 2021 Scientists in School rebranded with a new look that included fonts, icons, colours, and a new logo . The logo features a hand to signify the importance of the hands-on element in all the workshops. The hand image also features a "loop" to signify the infinite possibilities of STEM. In 2022 Scientists in School launched a fully accessible user-friendly new website.

Awards 
 Conference Board of Canada's Top 100 Best Community-Business-Education Partnerships (1997)
 Michael Smith Award for Excellence in Science Promotion by The Natural Sciences and Engineering Research Council of Canada (NSERC)
 YWCA Durham Region Women of Distinction Award to Executive Director Cindy Adams (2003)
 Ajax/Pickering Board of Trade 2009 Business Excellence Award
 Ajax-Pickering Board of Trade Award in 2017

Impact By Numbers 

 700,000 children and youth inspired annually through workshops
 25,000 investigative workshops delivered annually
 250,000 of the children reached live in communities where they face barriers to educational enrichment including low-income, Indigenous, rural, remote, and newcomer communities

References 

Scientific organizations based in Canada
Educational organizations based in Ontario
Pickering, Ontario